Ihar Mikalayevich Hurynovich (Igor Nikolayevich Gurinovich; born 5 March 1960) is a Soviet and Belarusian former professional footballer who played as a forward.

International career
Hurynovich played his only game for USSR on 28 March 1984, in a friendly against West Germany.

Honours
Dinamo Minsk
 Soviet Top League: 1982

Soviet Union
 UEFA Under-18 Euro: 1978
 FIFA World Youth Championship runner-up: 1979

References
 National team profile 
 

1960 births
Living people
Footballers from Minsk
Soviet footballers
Belarusian footballers
Association football forwards
Soviet Union international footballers
Belarus international footballers
Dual internationalists (football)
Soviet Top League players
Ukrainian Premier League players
Segunda División players
Austrian Football Bundesliga players
FC Dinamo Minsk players
FC Lokomotiv Moscow players
Brighton & Hove Albion F.C. players
FC Dynamo Brest players
APEP FC players
NK Veres Rivne players
FC Torpedo Minsk players
ŁKS Łódź players
CD Castellón footballers
FC Ataka Minsk players
LASK players
Belarusian football managers
FC Bereza-2010 managers
Cypriot Second Division players
Soviet expatriate footballers
Belarusian expatriate footballers
Belarusian expatriate sportspeople in England
Expatriate footballers in England
Belarusian expatriate sportspeople in Cyprus
Expatriate footballers in Cyprus
Belarusian expatriate sportspeople in Ukraine
Expatriate footballers in Ukraine
Belarusian expatriate sportspeople in Poland
Expatriate footballers in Poland
Belarusian expatriate sportspeople in Spain
Expatriate footballers in Spain
Belarusian expatriate sportspeople in Austria
Expatriate footballers in Austria